The Gypsum Springs Formation is a stratigraphical unit of Middle Jurassic age in the Williston Basin.

It takes the name from Gypsum Springs in Wyoming, and was first described in outcrop in Freemont County by J.D. Love in 1939.

Lithology
The Gypsum Springs Formation is composed of massive white gypsum in the lower part, and alternating gypsum, red shale, dolomite and limestone.

Distribution
It occurs from the Black Hills in South Dakota through Wyoming and into southern Saskatchewan.

Relationship to other units
It is equivalent to the upper part of the Watrous Formation and the lower part of the Gravelbourg Formation in Saskatchewan.

References

Stratigraphy of Saskatchewan
Geologic formations of Montana
Geologic formations of Wyoming
Bajocian Stage
Middle Jurassic Series